The Minority Rights Action Party or , abbreviated MIRA, is a political party in Malaysia. The party was among the latest new parties registration approved by the Registrar of Society in 2018. MIRA Party was founded by Kannan Ramasamy and Late Francis Rhajahh. The party's aims is to be voice of minority in Malaysia and establish policy for minorities along the UN Declaration on Minorities Right 1992.

Adopted by General Assembly resolution 47/135 of 18 December 1992]}}</ref> Party being the first Indian Malaysian national bilingual and multi-racial party hope to join Pakatan Harapan to represent Indian community and other minorities  in Malaysia.

Minority Rights Action Party was officially accepted as strategic partner of Pakatan Harapan in 2018. Since then, it took a more neutral stance and planned to merge with a BN-friendly party, Parti Kuasa Rakyat, led by Kamaruzaman Yakob, brother of 9th Prime Minister of Malaysia Ismail Sabri Yaakob.

Leadership structure
 President:
 K. Palanisamy (acting)
 Deputy/Acting President:
 R.Chandrasegaran
 Secretary General:
 Kannan Ramasamy
 Treasurer General:
 Karthigesu Karuppiah

See also
Politics of Malaysia
List of political parties in Malaysia

References

External links 
 
 

Political parties in Malaysia
2018 establishments in Malaysia
Political parties established in 2018